The 2004 Nebraska Cornhuskers football team represented the University of Nebraska–Lincoln in the 2004 NCAA Division I-A football season. The team was coached by Bill Callahan and played their home games in Memorial Stadium in Lincoln, Nebraska. This was Nebraska's first losing season since 1961.

Schedule

Roster and coaching staff

Depth chart

Game summaries

Western Illinois

Southern Miss

Pittsburgh

Kansas

Texas Tech

Baylor

Kansas State

Missouri

Source: ESPN

Iowa State

Oklahoma

Colorado

Rankings

After the season
Nebraska finished tied for 3rd place in the Big 12 North Division and tied for 7th conference-wide, with a final record of 5-6 (3-5), its first losing season since 1961. Head Coach Bill Callahan's overall career record was established at 5-6 (.455) and 3-5 (.375) in conference. Nebraska did not play in a bowl game for the first time since 1968, ending their consecutive bowl streak at 35.

Awards

NFL and pro players
The following Nebraska players who participated in the 2004 season later moved on to the next level and joined a professional or semi-pro team as draftees or free agents.

References

Nebraska
Nebraska Cornhuskers football seasons
Nebraska Cornhuskers football